Jacot is a surname. Notable people with the surname include:

Adam Jacot de Boinod (born 1960), British author
Christopher Jacot (born 1979), Canadian actor
Francis Jacot (born 1956), Swiss cross-country skier
Michèle Jacot (born 1952), French alpine skier
Monique Jacot (born 1934), Swiss photographer, photojournalist
Thierry Jacot (born 1961), Swiss swimmer

See also
Jacquot
Jacox